West Melbourne is a city in Brevard County, Florida, United States. It was created in 1959 to stop the area from being annexed into the city of Melbourne. As of the 2010 United States Census, the population was 18,355, reflecting an increase of 8,531 from the 9,824 counted in the 2000 Census. In 1970, the city's population was approximately 3,050. Since 2000, the city has experienced the highest population growth percentage of any municipality in Brevard County. It is part of the Palm Bay–Melbourne–Titusville Metropolitan Statistical Area.

History

Voters created the city in 1959 to stop the area from being annexed into the City of Melbourne.

In 2005, the City of West Melbourne started charging property taxes for the first time in its existence (since 1959). Prior to 2005, the city survived on a "fees only" tax revenue system for its $17 million budget.

From 2005 to 2014, home-schooled students, all three children from a West Melbourne family, won the state spelling bee championship a total of seven times, from two to three times each.

Government 
The City of West Melbourne utilizes a Council-Manager form of government.  The City Council consists of the mayor and six council members. The City Management consists of a city manager and a twelve-person executive management team. The city government offices are located at the West Melbourne City Hall.

In 2007, the city had a taxable real estate base of $1.32 billion.

In 2011, about half the city general fund was spent on the police department.

City council
Hal Rose, Mayor (November 2013 – Present)
Andrea Young, Council Member (November 2011 – Present)
Pat Bentley, Council Member (November 2012 – Present)
John Dittmore, Deputy Mayor, Council Member (May 2018 – Present)
Daniel Batcheldor, Council Member (November 2018 – Present)
Daniel McDow, Council Member (November 2020 – Present)
Stephen Phrampus, Council Member (November 2020 – Present)

City management
The city experienced a 35% increase in crime for 2010, the highest rise in Brevard County, most areas of which experienced a drop in crime. This included 48.5% more burglaries.

In 2010 the number of police officers dropped from 38 to 33, due to a hiring freeze.

The fee for garbage disposal was $10.24 per month per household in 2011–2012.

Personnel who operate the city government, under the guidance of the city council, include:
Scott Morgan, City Manager
Richard T. Wiley, Police Chief
Morris Richardson, City Attorney

Geography
West Melbourne is located at  (28.077895, −80.665326).

Climate

Demographics

Since 2000, the city has experienced the highest population growth percentage of any municipality in Brevard County.

As of the 2000 census, there were 9,824 people, 4,497 households, and 2,693 families residing in the city. The racial makeup of the city was 93.68% White, 1.40% African American, 0.13% Native American, 2.08% Asian, 0.03% Pacific Islander, 1.21% from other races, and 1.47% from two or more races. Hispanic or Latino of any race were 3.84% of the population.

There were 4,497 households, out of which 19.1% had children under the age of 18 living with them, 49.0% were married couples living together, 8.5% had a female householder with no husband present, and 40.1% were non-families. 34.0% of all households were made up of individuals, and 18.8% had someone living alone who was 65 years of age or older.  The average household size was 2.08 and the average family size was 2.63.

The population in the city was spread out, with 15.9% under the age of 18, 5.8% from 18 to 24, 24.2% from 25 to 44, 23.1% from 45 to 64, and 31.0% who were 65 years of age or older.  The median age was 49 years. For every 100 females, there were 85.5 males.  For every 100 females age 18 and over, there were 82.3 males.

Education
Public schools are run by the Brevard County School Board.

Schools within West Melbourne include:

PK3–Kindergarten
Brevard Christian School

Elementary schools
Meadowlane Primary Elementary
West Melbourne Elementary School for Science
Meadowlane Intermediate Elementary
Calvary Chapel Academy (private)
Brevard Christian School (private)
New Hope Lutheran Academy (private)

Middle schools
Central Middle School
Calvary Chapel Academy (private)
Brevard Christian School (private)
New Hope Lutheran Academy (private)

High schools
Brevard Christian School
West Melbourne Christian Academy, K–12

Economy

Personal income
The median income for a household in the city was $37,391, and the median income for a family was $46,486. Males had a median income of $38,693 versus $27,040 for females. The per capita income for the city was $24,006.  About 4.9% of families and 7.8% of the population were below the poverty line, including 9.9% of those under age 18 and 6.8% of those age 65 or over.

Workforce
In 2007, the average size of West Melbourne's labor force was 5,074. Of that group, 4,783 were employed and 291 were unemployed, for an unemployment rate of 5.7%.

Housing
In 2008, 83 building permits were issued. This was down from 174 permits in 2007, which was up from 142 permits in 2006.

The median home price in 2007 was $226,000.

Infrastructure

Roads 

  Interstate 95 – There is one exit in West Melbourne: Exit 180 (U.S. 192). The newer Exit 182 is nearby to West Melbourne, however.
  U.S. 192 – The main route through West Melbourne, locally known as New Haven Avenue. Almost all economic activity is located along this road. Major intersections include Interstate 95, CR 511, and CR 509.
  CR 509 – Locally known as Wickham Road north of U.S. 192 and Minton Road south of U.S. 192, this route forms a main transportation route through the south-central part of the county. Major intersections include U.S. 192 and Ellis Road.
  CR 511 – Locally known as John Rodes Parkway, this road is a non-freeway parallel to Interstate 95. Major intersections include U.S. 192 and Ellis Road.

Potable water
In 2017, West Melbourne residents were still purchasing their water from the utility owned by the neighboring City of Melbourne. It cost slightly over 1.1 cents per gallon, for a consumer of  monthly. The city owns its underground network of conduits.

Recreation
On 5 January 2016, the Space Coast Field of Dreams opened to the public in the West Melbourne Community Park.

References

External links

 
 City Codes and Ordinances

 
Cities in Brevard County, Florida
Populated places established in 1959
Cities in Florida
1959 establishments in Florida